Les filles du botaniste (Chinese: 植物园, Botanic Garden) is a French and Canadian film, with the background set as in China. It was released in 2006. Its English title is The Chinese Botanist's Daughters.

Plot
Set in China in the 1980s or 1990s, the film tells the story of Li Ming, a young orphan of the Tangshan earthquake, who leaves to study at the home of a renowned botanist. A secretive man and commanding father, he lives on an island that he has transformed into a luxurious garden. Anxious to share this solitary life, his daughter, An, welcomes with joy the arrival of the female student. Soon their friendship develops into a sensual, but forbidden attraction. Incapable of separating themselves, Ming and An create a dangerous arrangement to be able to continue spending their lives together: Ming marries An's brother, who is a People's Liberation Army (PLA) soldier and cannot bring his wife with him. However, An and Ming's relationship is discovered by the botanist who has a heart attack when he finds out. Before he dies, he tells police that it was his daughter and daughter-in-law's homosexuality "disease" that killed him. Thus, An and Ming are sentenced to death by a court and executed.

Casting
 Mylène Jampanoï — Li Ming
 Li Xiaoran — An
 Dongfu Lin — Botanist

Controversies
Due to the sensitivity of the topic of homosexuality, this movie was not allowed to be shot in China. It was shot in northern Vietnam instead (mainly in Ba Vì and Hà Tây) to create a similar environment.

Awards and nominations
Montréal World Film Festival:
Best Artistic Contribution (Guy Dufaux, won)
People's Choice Award (Sijie Dai, won)
Grand Prix des Amériques (Sijie Dai, nominated)

Inside Out Film and Video Festival:
Best Canadian Film or Video (Sijie Dai, won)

References

External links
Official site in French
Release information

 Les Filles du Botaniste at ELMS
 
The Chinese Botanist's Daughters Interview with Dai Sijie in Tokyo Wrestling

2006 films
2006 romantic comedy-drama films
Canadian romantic comedy-drama films
French romantic comedy-drama films
Lesbian-related films
Canadian LGBT-related films
French LGBT-related films
2000s Mandarin-language films
Films set in China
Films directed by Dai Sijie
2006 LGBT-related films
LGBT-related comedy films
LGBT-related drama films
Films shot in Vietnam
2006 comedy films
2006 drama films
LGBT-related controversies in film
Film controversies in China
2000s Canadian films
2000s French films